Caesar von Hofacker (sometimes Cäsar; 2 March 1896 – 20 December 1944) was a German Luftwaffe Lieutenant Colonel and member of the 20 July plot against Adolf Hitler.

Career
Hofacker was born in Ludwigsburg; his father Eberhard von Hofacker was a general in World War I.

Hofacker's main activity in relation to the events culminating in the attempted assassination of Hitler at the Wolf's Lair on 20 July 1944 consisted of acting as a secret liaison between his cousin, Claus Graf Schenk von Stauffenberg, and another plotter in occupied Paris, General Carl-Heinrich von Stülpnagel, France's military governor, to whom he was personal adviser. Hofacker assessed the chances of the coup attempt as "only ten percent". He had a point of introduction to Field Marshal Erwin Rommel as Rommel served under Hofacker's father in World War I; Rommel considered the elder Hofacker something of a hero. Hofacker tried to draw Rommel into the plot to rid Germany of Hitler, but although Rommel gave his backing to the conspiracy Rommel did not agree that Hitler should be killed.

On 26 July 1944, Hofacker was arrested in Paris, taken to Berlin Gestapo headquarters where, according to William Shirer in The Rise and Fall of the 3rd Reich, he was horrifically tortured and gave up the name of Erwin Rommel stating that Rommel said to  "Tell the people in Berlin they can count on me". This was support for the conspiracy to overthrow Hitler, not to kill him - but this made no difference to Hitler who ordered the forced suicide of Erwin Rommel and a false hero's funeral. The torture confession was taken down and Hofacker was put on trial before the Volksgerichtshof. He was found guilty of treason and sentenced to death. He was hanged at Plötzensee Prison in Berlin.

Notes

1896 births
1944 deaths
Executed members of the 20 July plot
People from Baden-Württemberg executed at Plötzensee Prison
Luftwaffe personnel of World War II
People from Ludwigsburg
People from the Kingdom of Württemberg
Executed people from Baden-Württemberg
Executed military personnel
People executed by hanging at Plötzensee Prison
Luftstreitkräfte personnel